Anne Teresa, Baroness De Keersmaeker (born 1960 in Mechelen, Belgium, grew up in Wemmel) is a contemporary dance choreographer. The dance company constructed around her, was in residence at La Monnaie in Brussels from 1992 to 2007.

Biography
De Keersmaeker did not study dance until her last year of high school, instead studying music, specifically the flute. She studied from 1978 to 1980 at Mudra in Brussels, a school with links to La Monnaie and to Maurice Béjart's Ballet of the 20th Century. She has said that the percussionist and her music teacher at MUDRA, was a major influence on her. In 1981, she attended the Tisch School of the Arts at New York University. While at the Tisch she presented her first production, Asch (1980), in Brussels. In 1982 upon her return from the U.S.A. she created , four movements to the music of Steve Reich. It was this production that brought her "a breakthrough on the international dance scene, performing, among other places, at the Avignon Festival".

The success of Fase contributed largely to the foundation of the Rosas in 1983. Rosas danst Rosas - Anne Teresa De Keersmaeker's first choreography for the young company to new compositions of Thierry De Mey and Peter Vermeersch - brought Rosas the international breakthrough as a company. During the eighties, Rosas was supported by Kaaitheater of Brussels (director Hugo De Greef). Within the framework of Kaaitheater, her oeuvre took shape. Performances such as Elena's Aria (1984), Bartók/Aantekeningen (1986), a staging of Heiner Müller's triptych Verkommenes Ufer/Medeamaterial Landschaft mit Argonauten (1987), Mikrokosmos-Monument Selbstporträt mit Reich und Riley (und Chopin ist auch dabei)/In zart fliessender Bewegung - Quatuor Nr.4, (1987), Ottone, Ottone (1988), Stella (1990) and Achterland (1990) were produced in collaboration with Kaaitheater.

In 1992, La Monnaie's general director Bernard Foccroulle invited Rosas to become the resident company of Brussels' Royal Opera De Munt/La Monnaie. At the start of the residency, Anne Teresa De Keersmaeker set herself three objectives: to intensify the relation between dance and music, to build a repertory, and to launch a dance school (after the disappearance of MUDRA from Brussels in 1988). That year, Rosas created ERTS and released Rosa - a film of a choreography by Anne Teresa De Keersmaeker to Bartók music directed by Peter Greenaway. Later that year, Rosas created Mozart Concert Arias, un moto di gioia for the Avignon Festival. A production made in collaboration with the Orchestre des Champs Elysées, directed by Philippe Herreweghe. In 1993, Rosas created Toccata, to the music of J.S. Bach, for the Holland Festival. In May 1994, the KunstenFESTIVALdes Arts in Brussels premièred Kinok, produced in collaboration with Thierry De Mey and the Ictus Ensemble. At the end of 1994, this collaboration resulted in a new creation: Amor Constante más allá de la muerte. In November 1995, La Monnaie premièred Verklärte Nacht, a choreography that was part of a production of Schönberg music Erwartung/Verklärte Nacht.

In 1995, Rosas and La Monnaie launched in Brussels a new international school for contemporary dance, the Performing Arts Research and Training Studios (PARTS), where sixty students coming from some 25 countries are trained, over a three-year period, by more than 50 teachers.

In December 1996, Woud, three movements to the music of Berg, Schönberg & Wagner was premièred in Seville. 
At the beginning of 1997, Anne Teresa De Keersmaeker created, together with Steve Paxton and The Wooster Group, 3 solos for Vincent Dunoyer. In November 1997, Just Before, to a live performance by the Ictus Ensemble of music composed by Magnus Lindberg, John Cage, Iannis Xenakis, Steve Reich, Pierre Bartholomée and Thierry De Mey, was presented in La Monnaie. 

In February 1998, Anne Teresa De Keersmaeker made her debut as an opera director at La Monnaie with Bartók's Duke Bluebeard's Castle. In August 1998, the Impuls Festival in Vienna premièred Drumming, a production to Steve Reich's composition of the same name. In November 1998  she created The Lisbon Piece, for the Portuguese Companhia Nacional de Bailado: her first experience as a guest choreographer. 

In March 1999, Anne Teresa De Keersmaeker created, together with Rosas dancer Cynthia Loemij and Jolente De Keersmaeker and Frank Vercruyssen from the theatre company STAN, Quartett; a dance-theatre performance based on the text by Heiner Müller. One month later, she choreographed and danced a duet with Elizabeth Corbett for the production with/for/by. In May 1999, Rosas premiered I said I, a collaboration with Jolente De Keersmaeker for the direction, with the Ictus Ensemble, Aka Moon and DJ Grazzhoppa for the music composition and execution. Jan Joris Lamers designed the set and lighting and Dries van Noten the costumes. For In Real Time in 2000, Rosas again collaborated with Stan, as well as with the jazz-ensemble Aka Moon for the composition and live interpretation of the music.
In January 2001, Anne Teresa De Keersmaeker created Rain, another performance to a score by Steve Reich, his Music for 18 Musicians.

2002 saw the celebration of twenty years of Rosas and ten years of residence at La Monnaie, with the re-run of the text-pieces, the creation of (but if a look should) April me and Rain live, the two latter accompanied by Brussels contemporary music ensemble Ictus.  A 336 pages book Rosas, if and only if wonder was published and a multimedia exhibition was organised in newly opened halls at the Centre for Fine Arts, Brussels, and was attended by over 15,000 people. Once, a solo to the music of Joan Baez, concluded the celebration year's performances.

2003 showed yet a new evolution: whereas in the past her choreographies had been very precise and closely linked to the music, in Bitches Brew / Tacoma Narrows, De Keersmaeker for the first time allowed improvisation by her dancers during the performance.

Over the past years, Rosas has also revived several earlier pieces: Rosas danst Rosas, Mikrokosmos, Achterland and others. Rosas' productions have been invited by theatres and festivals across five continents.

In October 2011, De Keersmaeker's choreography from "Rosas Danst Rosas" and "Achterland" was sampled without permission by the R&B singer Beyoncé in the music video for the single Countdown.

In July 2021 she founded the ATDK Foundation a foundation with the intent of safeguarding her artistic legacy, and enable her to share her artistic excellence.

Awards
Both the performances and the films of Anne Teresa De Keersmaeker have been distinguished by various international awards. Rosas danst Rosas won the Bessie Award (1987), Mikrokosmos received a Japanese Dance Award for the best foreign production (1989), Stella got the London Dance and Performances Award (1989), Drumming was prized with the Golden Laurel Wreath for the best choreography in Sarajevo (October 1998). In 2011, she received the American Dance Festival Award for her career and at this occasion presented one of her seminal work Rosas danst Rosas (1983).

The film Hoppla! was awarded a Sole d'Oro in Italy and the Grand Prix Vidéo Danse in Sète (1989). The film Rosa has been distinguished by a Dance Screen Award, got a Special Jury Commendation in the Black and White Short Film Competition at the Film Festival in Cork and was selected for the 49th Mostra Interazionale d'Arte Cinematografica in Venice (1992). In 1994 in Lyon a Dance Screen Award was offered to the film Achterland (1994), while the film Rosas danst Rosas obtained the Grand Prix International Vidéo Danse in 1997 and the special prize of the Jury of the International Festival of Film and New Media on Art in Athens in 1998. In 2000, the short film Tippeke got the Grand Prix Carina Ari of the Festival International Media Dance in Boulogne-Billancourt.
Furthermore, in June 1995, Anne Teresa De Keersmaeker received the title of Doctor Honoris Causa at the Vrije Universiteit Brussel. In March 1996 the government of the province of Antwerp awarded her the Eugène Baie prize, and in May 2000 she was awarded by the French Republic the "Officier dans l'Ordre des Arts et des Lettres" title. In 2002 she received the annual award of the Gabriella Moortgat Stichting and la médaille de Vermeil from the City of Paris and a medal ('Erepenning') of the Belgian Flemish government. In 2004 she was awarded the "Keizer Karelprijs" by the province of Oost Vlaanderen. In 2008, she became—again in France—"Commandeur de l'Ordre des Arts et des Lettres".

Honours 
 1996: Created Baroness de Keersmaeker, by king Albert II.
 2000: Officer in the Ordre des Arts et des Lettres
 2005: Member of the Royal Flemish Academy of Belgium for Science and the Arts.
 2008: Commander in the Order of Arts and Letters.
 2012: Golden Medal of the City of Lisbon.
 2015: Austrian Decoration for Science and Art.

Choreography

Choreography for other companies than Rosas
 The Lisbon Piece (for the Portuguese Companhia Nacional de Bailado)

Opera directions
 Bluebeard's Castle (music by Bartók) (1998)
 I due Foscari (music by Verdi) (2003)
 Hanjo (music by Toshio Hosokawa) (2004)
 Così fan tutte (music by Mozart) (2017)

Filmography
 Répétitions (Marie André, 1985, 43min)
 Hoppla! (Wolfgang Kolb, 1989, 52min)
 Monoloog van Fumiyo Ikeda op het einde van Ottone, Ottone (Walter Verdin, Anne Teresa De Keersmaeker and Jean-Luc Ducourt, 1989, 6min23sec)
 Ottone, Ottone (Part 1 and 2) (Walter Verdin and Anne Teresa De Keersmaeker, 1991, Part 1: 52min and Part 2: 50min)
 Rosa (Peter Greenaway, 1992, 16min)
 Mozartmateriaal (Jurgen Persijn and Ana Torfs, 1993, 52min)
 Achterland (Anne Teresa De Keersmaeker and Herman Van Eyken, 1994, 84min)
 Tippeke (Thierry De Mey, 1996, 18min)
 Rosas danst Rosas (Thierry De Mey, 1997, 57min)
 Fase (Thierry De Mey, 2002, 58min)
 Rain (Olivia Rochette and Gerard-Jan Claes, 2012, 83min)

Sources

External links

Biography on Rosas website
Rosas, Bal Moderne and Dancing Kids!
Review of Rosas' performance of de Keersmaeker's Once by Ann Williams, 19 October 2003

Belgian choreographers
Belgian female dancers
Barons of Belgium
Dance directors of La Monnaie
1960 births
Living people
People from Mechelen
Tisch School of the Arts alumni
Bessie Award winners
Members of the Academy of Arts, Berlin
Members of the Royal Flemish Academy of Belgium for Science and the Arts
Contemporary dancers